Bebearia phranza, the white-spot forester, is a butterfly in the family Nymphalidae. It is found in Nigeria, Cameroon, the Republic of the Congo, the Central African Republic and the Democratic Republic of the Congo. The habitat consists of forests.

Adults are attracted to fallen fruit.

Subspecies
Bebearia phranza phranza (Nigeria, Cameroon, Congo)
Bebearia phranza fuscara Hecq, 1989 (northern Congo, Central African Republic, Democratic Republic of the Congo: Ubangi)
Bebearia phranza moreelsi d'Abrera, 1980 (Democratic Republic of the Congo: central and east to Uele, Ituri, northern Kivu, Equateur, Kasai, Sankuru and Lomami)
Bebearia phranza robiginosus (Talbot, 1927) (Democratic Republic of the Congo: Shaba)

References

Butterflies described in 1865
phranza
Butterflies of Africa
Taxa named by William Chapman Hewitson